The men's pole vault at the 1974 European Athletics Championships was held in Rome, Italy, at Stadio Olimpico on 6 September 1974.

Medalists

Results

Final
6 September

Participation
According to an unofficial count, 15 athletes from 9 countries participated in the event.

 (1)
 (2)
 (1)
 (1)
 (3)
 (3)
 (1)
 (2)
 (1)

References

Pole vault
Pole vault at the European Athletics Championships